OpenRaster is a file format proposed for the common exchange of layered images between raster graphics editors. It is meant as a replacement for later versions of the Adobe PSD format. OpenRaster is still in development and so far is supported by a few programs. The default file extension for OpenRaster files is ".ora".

Background
The Adobe Photoshop PSD file format was widely used as a cross-application file format for layered images. Adobe allowed this by releasing the format's specifications publicly. In 2006 Adobe changed this license to only grant access to and use of the specifications and documentation "for the purposes of internally developing Developer Programs in connection with Adobe Software products and incorporating portions or all of the Sample Code into Developer Programs." In response to these restrictions, the OpenRaster format was proposed by KDE and Krita developers Boudewijn Rempt and Cyrille Berger at the first Libre Graphics Meeting at Lyon, France in the spring of 2006 and is drawn from the Open Document Format.

Requirements
Following features should be present:

General
 full freely available documentation
 OpenDocument type of file format (archive with multiple files inside)
 extensible, but private undocumented extensions should be excluded, any extension should be added to the spec and documentation of the file format
 applications are not expected to support all features of the file format, but when manipulating the file they should not lose any information they cannot handle

Metadata
 storage of metadata using {XMP – Dublin Core – IPTC} tags
 possibility of storing metadata tags per layer
 storage of Exif tags
 all text data in Unicode (UTF-8 or UTF-16)

Layers
 storage of multiple layers
 storage of each layer's coordinates
 storage of blending (compositing) options for each layer
 storage of adjustment layers
 storage of layer effects
 groups of layers
 color information – profile, colorspace

Other
See
 storage of paths, clipping paths and text on path
 selections and masks
 embedding documents within OpenDocument frameworks
 support undo, history of commands and actions (like PSD)

Proposals and extensions
 palette
 embedded fonts (proposal to extension)
 multiple pages
 animation support using multiple pages and a timer (like PSD)

Challenges

According to the draft specification (as of October 2010), a major challenge for a cross-application format is that because not all of the features are available in all the programs, an image won't be displayed the same way in different applications, especially for adjustment/filters layers.

A likely work-around is the optional storage of a redundant extra layer containing the fully rendered pixel data as seen after all image processing, or possibly a lower-resolution snapshot of it suitable for previewing and thumbnailing.

Different implementations levels might be defined, like, tiny, simple, small, normal, full and custom.

Application support
OpenRaster has limited support in a few graphics programs and among these its cross-application use is not seamless.

See also

 Create Project
 openraster.org
 Libre Graphics Meeting
 free and open source software
 GIMP
 Krita
 FXG

References

External links
 Specification website
 Git repository
 
 
 Integration of GIMP OpenRaster into mainline

Graphics file formats
Graphics standards
Open formats
Freedesktop.org